George Rogers Clark (1752–1818) was an American military officer on the northwestern frontier during the American Revolutionary War.

George Rogers Clark may also refer to:
 Bust of George Rogers Clark, a 1985 bust by David McLary
 George Rogers Clark Monument, a 1921 bronze by Robert Aitken in Charlottesville, Virginia
 George Rogers Clark National Historical Park
 George Rogers Clark Memorial Bridge
 George Rogers Clark Flag
 George Rogers Clark Homesite
 George Rogers Clark High School (Kentucky)
 George Rogers Clark Jr./Sr. High School (Hammond, IN)

See also
 George Rogers Clark Floyd (1810–1895), West Virginia politician and businessman